Machu Pirqa (Quechua machu old, old person, pirqa wall, "old wall", hispanicized spelling Machupirca) is an archaeological site of the Chachapoyas culture in Peru. It is located in the Amazonas Region, Chachapoyas Province, Magdalena District.

See also 
 Purum Llaqta
 Quchapampa

References 

Archaeological sites in Peru
Archaeological sites in Amazonas Region